Vlastimil Lada-Sázavský (31 March 1886 – 22 April 1956) was a Bohemian fencer. He won a bronze medal in the team sabre event at the 1908 Summer Olympics.

References

1886 births
1956 deaths
Czech male fencers
Olympic fencers of Bohemia
Fencers at the 1906 Intercalated Games
Fencers at the 1908 Summer Olympics
Olympic bronze medalists for Bohemia
Olympic medalists in fencing
Sportspeople from Prague
Medalists at the 1908 Summer Olympics